Bovis Construction (formerly C. W. Bovis & Co.) was a major British construction business. It was acquired by Lendlease in 1999.

History

C. W. Bovis & Co was founded by Charles William Bovis in London in 1885. It changed hands in 1908 when it was acquired by Samuel Joseph and his cousin, Sidney Gluckstein.

Bovis was one of the few construction companies to go public in the 1920s, during which time it developed an extensive retail clientele, by far the most important and long lasting of which was Marks & Spencer.  Central to the relationship with Marks was the pioneering Bovis System contract, designed to bring the interests of the contractor and client together: “the Bovis System pays the builder the prime cost of the work plus an agreed fee to cover overheads and profit. The client receives any savings during construction instead of the contractor.” 

During World War II, Bovis built the munitions factory at Swynnerton and worked on Mulberry harbour units. At the end of hostilities, Bovis resumed work for the private sector and in the early 1950s, the company moved into housing. Following the acquisition of Frank Sanderson's business in 1967, Bovis Homes expanded rapidly and became one of the largest housebuilders by the early 1970s.

Frank Sanderson was to change radically the future of Bovis. He was appointed Managing Director of Bovis Holdings in January 1970, and Chairman and Chief Executive in August 1972.  After a number of housing acquisitions, Sanderson attempted to obtain control of P&O by means of a reverse takeover. An initial agreement was followed by a boardroom and shareholder revolt at P&O and at the end of 1972 the merger failed. There was boardroom dissension, too, at Bovis and Sanderson was forced out in September 1973.

One of Sanderson’s acquisitions, in 1971, had been Twentieth Century Banking, and two years later the secondary banking crisis created a run on deposits at the Bovis banking subsidiary. The crisis came to a head in December 1973 when National Westminster Bank refused to provide the necessary funds. A rescue of Bovis was inevitable and, ironically, the rescuer proved to be P&O: in March 1974 Bovis became a subsidiary of P&O.

From 1985 the company was led by Sir Frank Lampl, who changed it from a British concern into an international contractor. It acquired McDevitt & Street, a US contractor, in September 1990. Bovis Homes was demerged in 1997, and floated on the London Stock Exchange.

The company was bought by Lendlease in 1999, at which time it became Bovis Lend Lease.

Major projects
Major projects involving Bovis Construction have included:

 the Queen Elizabeth II Centre completed in 1986
 the Lloyd's building in London also completed in 1986
 the Meadowhall Shopping Centre in Sheffield completed in 1990
 Disneyland Paris completed in 1992
 the Trafford Shopping Centre in Manchester completed in 1998
 the Bluewater Shopping Centre in Kent completed in 1999

References

Further reading
Building Relationships, The History of Bovis 1885-2000, Peter Cooper, Cassell & Co (2000) 

Companies established in 1885
Construction and civil engineering companies of the United Kingdom
Lendlease
1885 establishments in England
British companies established in 1885
Construction and civil engineering companies established in 1885
Companies formerly listed on the London Stock Exchange